Billy Row is a village in County Durham, England. It is situated a short distance to the north of Crook. According to the 2001 census Billy Row has a population of 824.

The name Billy Row was given by Sir William Row who was given the land of billy row.

References

External links

Villages in County Durham
Crook, County Durham